The Memphis Open was a professional tennis tournament that ran from 1975 to 2017. From 1977 onwards, the event was held at the Racquet Club of Memphis in Memphis, Tennessee. The Memphis Open was the only ATP event in the United States which was played on indoor hard courts; it usually took place in February. For part of its history it was a combined men's and women's tournament, but for its final four years it was solely a men's tournament.

The event was previously known under various sponsored names including the Regions Morgan Keegan Championships, the Kroger St. Jude Championship, the Volvo Championships, the Cellular South Cup, and the Federal Express International and was for a period time part of the now defunct U.S. National Indoor Tennis Championships.

The last singles champion of the Memphis Open was Ryan Harrison and the last doubles champions are Brian Baker and Nikola Mektić. The 2017 Memphis Open titles were the first career titles for all three men. As of 2018, the tournament has moved to New York as the new New York Open.

History

In 1974, Memphis cotton merchant William B. "Billy" Dunavant Jr. purchased the Memphis Athletic Club and began a $7 M expansion to transform the facility into what is now the Racquet Club of Memphis. What is now known as the Memphis Open was first played in 1975 on indoor carpet as part of the WCT. In 1977, the U.S. National Indoor Tennis Championships moved to Memphis from Salisbury, Maryland and increased the event's prize money to $220,000. The Memphis Open had the distinction (until 2014) of being the only private indoor racquet club in the world to host a men's and women's professional tennis event. The tournament was played on indoor carpet into the 1980s, but the club eventually changed its surface to hard courts.

In November 2001, the Racquet Club of Memphis purchased the rights to the WTA event in Oklahoma City and moved it to Memphis, where the tournament hosted both men's and women's events for 12 years. In 2008, the event was elevated to ATP 500 Series status. In 2014, the men's and women's events moved to Rio de Janeiro. Memphis then purchased the ATP 250 event in San Jose to keep professional tennis in the city. In late 2014, Tennis Rendezvous LLC, owned by the USTA and Golden Set Holdings LLC, purchased the U.S. National Indoor Tennis Championships and renamed it the Memphis Open. In 2015, the Memphis Open was sold again, purchased by New York-based financial management company GF Capital.

Over the years, the Memphis Open has counted nine ATP year-end No. 1 players among its winners: Bjorn Borg, Jimmy Connors, John McEnroe, Stefan Edberg, Andre Agassi, Ivan Lendl, Jim Courier, Pete Sampras, and Andy Roddick. In 2016, Kei Nishikori won the event for a fourth consecutive time, tying Connors' record for the most overall Memphis titles.

In April 2017 the ATP announced that the tournament will relocate to the Nassau Veterans Memorial Coliseum in Long Island, New York in 2018 after the event failed to find a title sponsor in Memphis.

Finals

Singles

Doubles

Records

See also
List of tennis tournaments
ATP World Tour

References

External links
 Official website
 Twitter
 Facebook
 Instagram

 
Indoor tennis tournaments
Hard court tennis tournaments in the United States
ATP Tour
ATP Tour 250
Sports in Memphis, Tennessee
Tennis in Tennessee
Recurring sporting events established in 1975